is a Japanese rock/jazz fusion duo consisting of core members , born May 9, 1978, and , born February 25, 1978, formed in 1999. Formerly with BMG Japan (bought by SMEJ in early 2009), they signed with Sony Music Japan's Ariola Japan label in September 2009.

History
Ōhashi's musical duties include vocals, guitar, and harmonica, while Tokita plays piano/keyboards, numerous other instruments, and oversees overall production.  Most of the other instrumentation heard on their albums is handled by guests and studio musicians.  In this sense, their band structure and chemistry could be compared to that of the American group Steely Dan. Their style is very heavily jazz influenced (another similarity with Steely Dan), yet it retains core pop elements and catchy melodies that have proved popular with Japanese audiences.

In popular culture
Many of Sukima Switch's songs have appeared in anime and video games. Ōhashi also covered the song "Katamari on the Swing" in the PlayStation 3 game Katamari Forever.

 Their second single, "Kanade", was covered by Sora Amamiya and Rie Takahashi for the ending themes to the anime series One Week Friends and Teasing Master Takagi-san 2, respectively. The song was also used as the theme song for the live-action adaptation of One Week Friends.
 Their fifth single, "Zenryoku Shounen", is featured as the first song in the Nintendo DS game Moero! Nekketsu Rhythm Damashii Osu! Tatakae! Ouendan 2, which was released in Japan on May 17, 2007. The song is also in the expansion pack to the Nintendo DS game Daigasso! Band Brothers. The song was re-released for the Japanese release of Disney and Pixar's 2020 film Onward.
 Their seventh single, "Boku Note", was also used as the theme song for Doraemon: Nobita's Dinosaur 2006.
 The eighth single, "Guarana" is the theme song of the film adaptation of Rough, with their second, third and fifth singles used as inserts.
 The song "Shizuku" is the opening theme for the anime adaptation of the novel series The Beast Player.
 Their 12th single, "Golden Time Lover", is the third opening of the anime series Fullmetal Alchemist: Brotherhood.
 Their 13th single, "Ice Cream Syndrome", is the ending theme of the Pokémon movie Phantom Ruler: Zoroark.
 Their 17th single, "Eureka", is the second opening to the anime Space Brothers.
 Their 19th single, "Hello Especially", is the ending song to the anime Silver Spoon.
 Their 20th single, "Ah Yeah!!", is the second opening to the anime Haikyuu!!.
 Their 22nd single, "Hoshi no Utsuwa" (星のうつわ), is the ending theme song for the anime film The Last: Naruto the Movie.
 Their 23rd single, "LINE", is the eighteenth opening to the anime Naruto Shippuden.

Discography

Singles
Debut single – "view" – July 9, 2003
2nd single – 奏 ("Kanade") – March 10, 2004
3rd single – ふれて未来を ("Furete Mirai o") – June 16, 2004
4th single – 冬の口笛 ("Fuyu no Kuchibue") – November 24, 2004
5th single – 全力少年 ("Zenryoku Shōnen") – April 20, 2005
6th single – 雨待ち風 ("Ame Machi Kaze") – June 22, 2005
7th single – ボクノート ("Boku Note") – March 1, 2006
8th single – ガラナ ("Guarana") – August 16, 2006
9th single – アカツキの詩 ("Akatsuki no Uta") – November 22, 2006
10th single – マリンスノウ ("Marine Snow") – July 11, 2007
11th single – 虹のレシピ ("Niji no Recipe") – May 20, 2009
12th single – ゴールデンタイムラバー ("Golden Time Lover") – October 14, 2009
13th single – アイスクリームシンドローム ("Ice Cream Syndrome") – July 7, 2010
14th single – さいごのひ ("Saigo no Hi") – January 26, 2011
15th single – 晴ときどき曇 ("Hare Tokidoki Kuromi")
16th single – ラストシーン ("Last Scene")
17th single – ユリーカ ("Eureka") – August 8, 2012
18th single – スカーレット ("Scarlet") – June 19, 2013
19th single – "Hello Especially" – July 31, 2013
20th single – "Ah Yeah!!" – July 23, 2014
21st single – パラボラヴァ ("Parabolover") – November 19, 2014
22nd single – 星のうつわ ("Star Vessel") – December 3, 2014
23rd single – "LINE" – November 11, 2015

Mini albums
Debut mini album – 君の話 (Kimi no Hanashi) – September 17, 2003

Studio albums
Debut album – 夏雲ノイズ (Natsugumo Noise) – June 23, 2004
2nd album – 空創クリップ (Kūsō Clip) – July 20, 2005
3rd album – 夕風ブレンド (Yuukaze Blend) – November 29, 2006
4th album – ナユタとフカシギ (Nayuta to Fukashigi) – November 4, 2009
5th album – musium – October 5, 2011
6th album – Sukima Switch – December 3, 2014
7th album – 新空間アルゴリズム (Shinkuukan Algorithm) – March 14, 2018
8th album - Hot Milk - November 17, 2021 (Streaming) | November 24, 2021 (physical CD)
9th album - Bitter Coffee - November 24, 2021

Concept albums
1st album – re:Action – February 15, 2017 
2nd album – スキマノハナタバ 〜Love Song Selection〜 (Sukima no Hanataba ~Love Song Selection~) – September 19, 2019
3rd album - スキマノハナタバ 〜Smile Song Selection〜 (Sukima no Hanataba ~Smile Song Selection~ - August 19, 2020

Compilation albums
1st album – グレイテスト・ヒッツ (Greatest Hits) – August 1, 2007
2nd album – DOUBLES BEST – August 22. 2012
3rd album – POPMAN'S WORLD〜All Time Best 2003-2013〜 – August 23, 2013
4th album – POPMAN'S ANOTHER WORLD – April 13, 2016

References

External links
 by Office Augusta
 by Sony Music Japan
 

Japanese pop music groups
Sony Music Entertainment Japan artists
Musical groups from Aichi Prefecture
Musical groups established in 1999
1999 establishments in Japan
Japanese musical duos